Parliamentary elections were held in Norway on 21 October 1912, with a second round held between 4 and 11 November. The result was a victory for the alliance of the Liberal Party and the Labour Democrats, which won 76 of the 123 seats in the Storting.

Results

References

General elections in Norway
1910s elections in Norway
Norway
Parliamentary
Norway
Norway